Ava "Arlene" Harden (born March 1, 1945) is an American country music singer. Between 1966 and 1968, she was one-third of The Harden Trio, which comprised her brother, Bobby and sister, Robbie. Arlene recorded for Columbia Records as a solo artist between 1967 and 1973, charting fifteen times on the Hot Country Songs charts. Her most successful release was a cover of Roy Orbison's "Oh, Pretty Woman", titled "Lovin' Man (Oh Pretty Woman)". She later recorded for Capitol and Elektra as Arleen Harden.

Discography

Albums

Singles

References

1945 births
American women country singers
American country singer-songwriters
Columbia Records artists
Living people
Singer-songwriters from Arkansas
People from Lonoke County, Arkansas
Country musicians from Arkansas
21st-century American women